Marques Adams (born November 14, 1981), who goes by the stage name Sevin, is an American Christian hip hop rapper who has officially retired from music in September 2018. He has released 20 studio albums: All or None (1999 and 2001), Evin Angelz Kry (2004), Holy Mictramony (2004 and 2006), Feel me... (2004 and 2006), Father Forgive Me (2005), Sevin presentz : Hog Life : The LP (2005 and 2006), Work of Art : The R&B EP (2007), B 4 I Wake (2007), We Die (2007), Str8 frum tha Dragonz Mouth (2008), HOG MOB : Tha LP (2008), Faith , Love & Lust (2009), " Unreleased aka Rezin" (2009-10?), Finally Home (2010), "Finally Home Vol. 2" (2011), Purple Reign (2011), Commissary (2013), Pray 4 My Hood (2015), "I'll Wait" (2015), Purple Heart (2016), "Surrender" (2017), "Rather Die Than Deny" (2018), "Tha Mob Chronicles (Vol. 1)" (2018), and his final album "4eva Mobn" (2018). The album Commissary was his breakthrough release upon the Billboard magazine charts. His four mixtapes were Nine 1 Sikk Mixtape volume 2 : City Of Kingz (2006) and 9 1 Sikk Mixtape volume 3 : Hunterz Moon (2007) Nine 1 Sikk Mixtape volume 4 : kakoon. He also released a greatest hits album, Street Legal (2006).

Early life
Marques Adams was born on November 14,  1981, in San Jose, California, the son of Tracy and Debra Adams (née; Pflugrad), where his two younger siblings were born, Danielle and Justus, while they eventually were raised in Sacramento, California, a place he considers to be his hometown. His parents run a ministry in his hometown.

Music career
His music recording career began in 1999 and he has since released 17 studio albums: All or None in 1999 and re-released in 2001, Evin Angelz Kry  in 2004, Holy Mictramony in 2004 and re-released in 2006, Feel me... in 2004 and re-released in 2006, Father Forgive Me in 2005, Sevin presentz : Hog Life : The LP in 2005 and re-released in 2006, Work of Art : The R&B EP in 2007, B 4 I Wake in 2007, We Die in 2007, Str8 frum tha Dragonz Mouth  in 2008, HOG MOB : Tha LP in 2008, Faith , Love & Lust in 2009, Finally Home in 2010, Purple Reign in 2011, Commissary in 2013, Pray 4 My Hood in 2015, and Purple Heart in 2016. Rather Die Than Deny was released in 2018. He has released two mixtapes Nine 1 Sikk Mixtape volume 2 : City Of Kingz in 2006 and 9 1 Sikk Mixtape volume 3 : Hunterz Moon in 2007, and a greatest hits album, Street Legal, released in 2006.

The album All or None was reviewed by Cross Rhythms magazine and Gospelflava. His album Finally Home was reviewed by Indie Vision Music. The album Commissary charted on the Billboard magazine Gospel Albums chart at No. 22. Bizzle signed him to a recording contract with God Over Money Records in 2016. The acronym HOG MOB means Hooked On God, Ministry Ova Business. His album, Purple Heart, charted on four Billboard magazine charts, while it placed on Christian Albums, Rap Albums, Independent Albums, and Heatseekers Albums, where it peaked at Nos. 13, 19, 37, and 5, correspondingly.

Ministry
He wants to utilize his Christian hip hop to impact the urban communities of the United States with the Gospel message.

Discography
Studio albums
 All or None (1999 and 2001)
 Evin Angelz Kry (2004)
 Holy Mictramony (2004 and 2006)
 Feel me... (2004 and 2006)
 Father Forgive Me (2005)
 Sevin presentz : Hog Life : The LP (2005 and 2006)
 Work of Art : The R&B EP (2007)
 B 4 I Wake (2007)
 We Die (2007)
 Str8 frum tha Dragonz Mouth (2008)
 "Unreleased aka Rezin" (2010)
 HOG MOB : Tha LP (2008)
 Faith , Love & Lust (2009)
 Finally Home (2010)
 "Finally Home Vol.2" (2011)
 Purple Reign (2011)
 Commissary (2013)
 Pray 4 My Hood (2015)
 "I'll Wait" (2015)
 Purple Heart (2016)
 Rather Die Than Deny (2018)
 4eva Mobbin (2018)
Mixtapes
 "HOG MOB Mixtape Vol.1 Genesis"
 Nine 1 Sikk Mixtape volume 2 : City Of Kingz (2006)
 9 1 Sikk Mixtape volume 3 : Hunterz Moon (2007)
 "91 Sikk Mixtape volume 4 : Kakoon" (2008)
 "HOGMOB Muzik Presentz: Freedom" (2009)
Featured Singles
 "Go For Mine ft. Jay Rich" NBA 2K7 
  Welcome to California by 40 Glocc ft. Snoop Dogg, Too Short, Xzibit and Sevin (2010)

References

External links
 Wade-O Radio interview

1981 births
Living people
American performers of Christian hip hop music
Musicians from San Jose, California
Musicians from Sacramento, California
Rappers from California
21st-century American rappers